Nobody may refer to:

 Nobody, an indefinite pronoun

Nobody may also refer to:

Fictional characters
Nobody (Kingdom Hearts), a race of beings in the Kingdom Hearts video game series
Nobody, a character in the Jim Jarmusch films Dead Man and Ghost Dog: The Way of the Samurai
Nobody, a character in the 1973 Italian film My Name Is Nobody
Nobody, a character in the Teenage Mutant Ninja Turtles franchise
 Odysseus, who used the name "nobody" in his battle against Polyphemus

Film and television
Nobody (1921 film), an American silent film
Nobody (2021 film), an American thriller film
"Nobody", an episode of Folklore

Music
Nobody (producer) (born 1977), American record producer

Albums
 Nobody (album) or the title song, by Chief Keef, 2014
 Nobody (EP) or the title song, by Cartman, 2000
 Nobody, mixtape by twlv, 2018

Songs
"Nobody" (1905 song), a song written by Alex Rogers and Bert A. Williams
"Nobody" (DJ Neptune song), 2020
"Nobody" (DJ Quik song), 2011
"Nobody" (Dylan Scott song), 2020
"Nobody" (James Cottriall song), 2014
"Nobody" (Keith Sweat song), 1996
"Nobody" (Martin Jensen and James Arthur song), 2019
"Nobody" (Mitski song), 2018
"Nobody" (Rick Ross song), 2014
"Nobody" (Shara Nelson song), 1994
"Nobody" (Skindred song), 2002
"Nobody" (Sylvia song), 1982
"Nobody" (Toni Basil song), 1981
"Nobody" (Wonder Girls song), 2008
"Nobody", by Ariana Grande and Chaka Khan from Charlie's Angels: Original Motion Picture Soundtrack, 2019
"Nobody", by Craig's Brother from Homecoming, 1998
"Nobody", by DJ Khaled from Grateful, 2017
"Nobody", by Emmylou Harris from Hard Bargain, 2011
"Nobody", by Gorgon City, 2020
"Nobody", by Hozier from Wasteland, Baby!, 2019
"Nobody", by Inna, 2020
"Nobody", by Jhené Aiko from Trip, 2017
"Nobody", by Keyakizaka46 from Kuroi Hitsuji, 2019
"Nobody", by Mac DeMarco from Here Comes the Cowboy, 2019
"Nobody", by Ne-Yo from Year of the Gentleman, 2008
"Nobody", by PartyNextDoor from PartyNextDoor 3, 2016
"Nobody", by Selena Gomez from Revival, 2015
"Nobody", by Todrick Hall from Forbidden, 2018
"Nobody", by Wizkid from Sounds from the Other Side, 2017

People
 John Eales (born 1970), former Australian rugby union captain, nicknamed "Nobody" (because "Nobody's perfect")
 Adam Nobody, demonstrator beaten by police at the 2010 G-20 Toronto summit protests
 James Robertson (orientalist) (1714–1795), author of Poems : consisting of tales, fables, epigrams, &c. &c. "by Nobody" (1770) 
 Nobody, formerly Rich Paul, write-in candidate in the 2020 New Hampshire gubernatorial election

Other uses
The Nobody, a 2009 graphic novel by Jeff Lemire
 Outis, Ancient Greek for "nobody", an often used pseudonym
 nobody (username), the name of a Unix account which has no particular privileges
 Nobody for President, a parodic campaign for the presidency of the United States of America

See also
 Nobodies (disambiguation)
 No One (disambiguation)
 Mr. Nobody (disambiguation)